Bataparu is a village in Kishni tehsil in Mainpuri district in the Indian state of Uttar Pradesh. It belongs to Agra division.

Location 
It is located 39 km towards South from District headquarters Mainpuri and 195 km from State capital Lucknow. Its Pin Code is 206303 and postal head office is Kusmara.

References 

Villages in Mainpuri district